The highest-selling albums and EPs in the United States are ranked in the Billboard 200, which is published by Billboard magazine. The data are compiled by Nielsen Soundscan based on each album's weekly physical and digital sales. In 1988, 11 albums advanced to the peak position of the chart.

The beginning of the year started with the continuation of Dirty Dancing but was bumped out of the number one spot by  Pop singer George Michael's first solo album Faith. It had the longest run among the releases, spending 12 non-consecutive weeks in the top position. The album was also notable for reaching the Top R&B/Hip-Hop Albums (U.S. Hot Black Singles) at number-one making it the first album by a Caucasian artist to hit the top spot on that chart, mainly due to the R&B/funk-leaning singles that were released from the album, most notably, "One More Try", "I Want Your Sex" and "Father Figure". Faith was the best-selling album of 1988 in the United States, and eventually reached Diamond certification by the RIAA. Closely behind Faith, the Dirty Dancing soundtrack spent 11 non-consecutive weeks in the top position. From its August 1987 release, it spent a total of 18 weeks at #1 on the Billboard 200 and went platinum eleven times.

Guns N' Roses' debut album, Appetite for Destruction, was their first number one album on the Billboard 200, and is one of the best selling albums in the U.S., being certified diamond (plus 18× platinum) by the RIAA.

Van Halen, Bon Jovi, and U2 each garnered their second number-one albums on the Billboard 200, while Tiffany, Def Leppard, Anita Baker, and Steve Winwood garnered their first.

Chart history

See also
 1988 in music
 List of number-one albums (United States)
 List of best-selling albums
 List of best-selling albums in the United States

References

1988
1988 record charts